Arctoperlaria is a suborder of stoneflies.

External links
Distribution for taxon

References

 Zwick. 1969. Das Phylogenetische System der Plecopteren als Ergebnis vergleichend-anatomischer Untersuchgen. 291 pp., Kurzfassung: 4 pp.
 Zwick. 1973. Das Tierreich 94:53, 213
 Zwick. 2000. Annu.Rev.Entomol. 45:718
 McLellan. 2006. Illiesia 2(2):15-23

Plecoptera
Insect suborders